Burton Snowboards is a privately-owned snowboard manufacturing company that was founded by Jake Burton Carpenter in 1977. The company specializes in products aimed at snowboarders, such as snowboards, bindings, boots, outerwear, and accessories. The company, whose flagship store is in Burlington, Vermont, was privately owned by Jake Burton Carpenter (also known as Jake Burton), until his death in 2019, and by his wife, Donna Carpenter, who has been active in the business since 1983.

History

Burton Snowboards was founded by Jake Burton in 1977. His co-founder, Dimitrije Milovich, was an East Coast surfer and the founder of snowboard company Winterstick. Their snowboards were inspired by the Snurfer, which was created in 1965 by Sherman Poppen. In 1977, Burton moved to Londonderry, Vermont, where he made the first Burton snowboard in his garage, by hand. Since Burton could not afford proper equipment, he applied polyurethane to the prototype. In 1978, the company moved to Manchester, Vermont.

Jake Burton campaigned for local ski resorts to open their lifts to snowboard riders. In 1982, the Suicide Six ski area, now called Saskadena Six Ski Area, in Pomfret, Vermont, was reportedly the first mountain to permit snowboarders, followed by Stratton Mountain, and, later, Jay Peak and Stowe. When resorts started to accept snowboarders on lifts, the public did too; and Burton became one of the main suppliers for snowboarders.

In 1982, Burton marketed its product at the National Snowboarding Championships, held at Suicide Six. Snow Valley also allowed snowboarders and in 1984 hosted the US Open. In 1985, the National Snowboarding Championships moved to Stratton Mountain and became the U.S. Open Snowboarding Championships, which was owned and operated by Burton. This competition helped legitimize the sport.

In 1985, Burton established the European Division of Burton Snowboards in Innsbruck, Austria. In 1986, distribution began in New Zealand. In 1992, the Burton factory relocated to Burlington, Vermont. In 1994, Burton opened its Japan division in Urawa-shi. In 2014, there were 400 employees in Burlington and 1,000 worldwide.

In 2008, several complaints arose when Burton produced snowboards that had illustrations of self-mutilation and Playboy bunnies. As a result, the Burton Love model was discontinued for the 2012 line and replaced by the Mr. Nice Guy.

As of 2009, Burton owned ten companies that sold snowboards, outerwear, and shoes. In 2008, Burton began to make surfboards in Vermont.

For many years, Burton and his wife—Donna Gaston Carpenter, whom he had married in 1983—hosted the Fall Bash, to promote goodwill among company employees and friends. In 2009, the Fall Bash became the subject of controversy after the company attempted to censor the press about it.

In 2010, Burton announced that Burton Snowboards would cease manufacturing in Vermont and move production to Austria. More recently, the company has shifted some of its snowboard production to China.

In December 2011, Burton named his wife, Donna Carpenter, as president of the company. In 2013, Donna Carpenter estimated that the company had 40 to 45% of the snowboarding market, which totaled $236 million. She said that the U.S. market constituted 35% of the company's business, with Europe making up 30%, and Japan and Canada the rest.

In May 2014, Burton named Mike Rees as CEO, while remaining as founder and chairman. In December 2015, Burton named Donna Carpenter as CEO (Mike Rees having left to be closer to family) and John Lacy as president.

In 2016, in light of the company's 40th anniversary, Burton's Chief Creative Officer, Greg Dacyshyn, stated he wished to keep both the sport and lifestyle aspect of the brand going for many years.

Jake Burton Carpenter died at his home on November 20, 2019, due to a recurrence of testicular cancer.

Technology
The first Burton snowboard was the BB1, a narrow board consisting of single-strap bindings with a rope and handle attached to the nose.

The company started using a single-channel binding-mounting system on its 2008 models. In 2009, this system was installed on other snowboard lines. A binding system was created with this system that was designed to give the rider more control and a greater board feels. This binding system, named EST® (Extra Sensory Technology), eliminates weight by mounting the binding to the board from the sides of the binding instead of the middle, getting rid of the middle baseplate.

Company overview 

Burton is now the second-largest snowboard manufacturer in the US; and its products are marketed worldwide in over 4,348 stores, 1,536 of which are in the United States. In 2003, Burton allowed several online companies to sell Burton products over the internet. For years, Burton products had been available only through local stores; but the company felt that an online presence would allow buyers to have an alternate way to buy Burton products, instead of having to turn to another brand.

As well as selling Burton products, Burton stores sell several sub-brands which focus on specific market niches. These sub-brands include Anon Optics (snowboard goggles and eyewear), RED (helmets and body armor), Analog (outerwear), and Gravis (footwear, now defunct). In 2005, Four Star Distribution sold four of its snowboard brands to Burton: Forum Snowboarding, Jeenyus, Foursquare, and Special Blend. Burton also owned surfboard manufacturer Channel Islands, but sold the brand in 2020.

The Burton line is split into four categories: freeride, for a big mountain ride; freestyle, for a versatile ride; park, for freestyle disciplines such as half-pipe and slopestyle; and carving, for carving down the sides of mountains. Each of these categories has different levels of performance and price. In 2009, Burton's line included 61 snowboards in men's, women's, and youth models. Board prices range from $300 to $1,500.

In February 2008, Burton acquired DNA Distribution, which includes the skateboard brands Alien Workshop, Habitat Skateboards, and Reflex.

In 2008, the snowboard equipment industry had grown to be worth $487 million. Burton had 40% to 70% of these sales, depending on the category. The average age of employees was 30.

Marketing and promotion
To attract rider interest, Burton Snowboards sponsors professional riders and events. Burton's sponsored professional snowboard team includes: Zeb Powell, Mark McMorris, Taylor Gold, Shaun White, Jeremy Jones, Kazuhiro Kokubo, Terje Haakonsen, Ellery Hollingsworth, Kelly Clark, Hannah Teter, and Kevin Pearce. Burton has avoided having complete sponsorship with Burton/Burton affiliated brands. Burton has come under criticism over its choices regarding team members, such as the removal of David Carrier Porcheron and other riders in 2008.

Burton sponsored the creation of organic terrain parks made of rocks, stumps, and logs. These parks, known as "The Stash" can be found at Northstar, California; Truckee, California; Jackson Hole, Wyoming; Killington Ski Resort, Vermont; Avoriaz, France; and The Remarkables, New Zealand.

Burton created the Chill program in 1995, to provide children with the opportunity to learn how to snowboard. Since its founding, Chill has provided over 12,000 underprivileged children the opportunity to learn how to snowboard. Because of the 2008 graphics controversy and concern over its effect on youth, a local beneficiary severed its ties with Burton.

Burton created the Learn to Ride program in 1998. It was the only snowboard company to focus on instruction methods and beginner-specific equipment. Its goal was to give beginner snowboarders the best initial snowboarding experience possible, so they would continue to snowboard. Burton has teamed up with the American Association of Snowboard Instructors, the Canadian Association of Snowboard Instructors, and major resorts around the world.

In December 2016, Burton launched a pop-up shop on Newbury Street in Boston.

Controversy 
In January 2022, BBC News reported on Burton's expansion into China and highlighted the company's role in promoting Xinjiang as a winter sports destination (ahead of China's hosting the Winter Olympics). Craig Smith, the boss of the company's China subsidiary, told the BBC Burton didn't want to "divorce" itself from the region by refusing to do business there, despite allegations of human rights abuse, including genocide of the Uyghurs. 

Allegations that the local Uyghur population of Xinjiang have been used as forced labor to pick cotton has also been observed to be at odds with Burton's membership of the Better Cotton Initiative - an industry body that aims to ensure the global cotton supply chain is free of forced labor.

References

External links

 

1977 establishments in Vermont
American companies established in 1977
Clothing companies of the United States
Companies based in Burlington, Vermont
Manufacturing companies based in Vermont
Privately held companies based in Vermont
Snowboarding companies
Sporting goods manufacturers of the United States